The 2019–20 EFL Trophy, known as the Leasing.com Trophy for sponsorship reasons, was the 37th season in the history of the competition, a knock-out tournament for English football clubs in League One and League Two of the English football system, and also including 16 Premier League and Championship "Academy teams" with Category One status. Due to their financial crisis, Bury were expelled from the EFL and automatically eliminated from the competition as well.

Portsmouth were the defending champions, and reached the final once again. Because, they were beaten on penalties by Salford City after a 0–0 draw. The final was held on March 13, 2021, having been delayed 11 months as the originally scheduled date of April 5, 2020 was just after suspension of English football due to the COVID-19 pandemic.

Participating clubs
48 clubs from League One and League Two.
16 invited Category One Academy teams.
Expelled clubs were automatically eliminated from the tournament.
Category One teams relegated to League One missed out on having academies participate in the following tournament.

Eligibility criteria for players
For EFL clubs
Minimum of four qualifying outfield players in their starting XI. A qualifying outfield player will be one who meets any of the following requirements:
Any player who started the previous or following first-team fixture.
Any player who is in the top 10 players at the club, who have made the most starting appearances in league and domestic cup competitions that season.
Any player with 40 or more first-team appearances in their career.
Any player on loan from a Premier League club or any EFL Category One Academy club.
A club can play any eligible goalkeeper in the competition

For invited teams
Minimum of six players in the starting line-up who played at under-21 level, as at 30 June 2019.
Teams may only include two players on the team sheet who are over the age of 21 and have made forty or more senior appearances, as at 30 June 2019.
A senior appearance will be defined as having played in a professional first-team fixture. A non-playing substitute does not count.

Competition format
Group stage
 Sixteen groups of 4 teams would be organised on a regionalised basis.
 All groups would include one invited club.
 All clubs would play each other once, either home or away (Academies play all group matches away from home).
 Clubs would be awarded three points for a win and one point for a draw.
 In the event of a drawn game (after 90 minutes), a penalty shootout would be held with the winning team earning an additional point.
 Clubs expelled from the EFL will be knocked out of the tournament automatically.
 The top two teams would progress to the Knockout Stage.

Knockout stage
 Round 2 and 3 of the competition will be drawn on a regionalised basis.
 In Round 2, the group winners shall be seeded and the group runners-up shall be unseeded in the draw.
 In Round 2, teams who played in the same group as each other in the Group Stage shall keep apart from each other.

Group stage

Northern Section

Group A

Group B

Group C

Group D

Group E

Group F

Group G

Group H

Southern Section

Group A

Group B

Group C

Group D

Group E

Group F

Group G

Group H

Round 2

Northern Section

Southern Section

Round 3

Northern Section

Southern Section

Quarter-finals

Semi-finals

Final

References

EFL Trophy
2019–20 European domestic association football cups
2019–20 English Football League
EFL Trophy